Glucocorticoid-induced transcript 1 protein is a protein that in humans is encoded by the GLCCI1 gene.

References

Further reading